Bergman is a surname of German, Swedish, Dutch and Yiddish origin meaning 'mountain man', or sometimes (only in German) 'miner'.

People
Alan Bergman (born 1925), American songwriter
Alan Bergman (1943–2010), American ballet dancer
Alfred Bergman (1889–1961), American baseball and football player
Amanda Bergman (born 1987), Swedish musician
Andrew Bergman (born 1945), American film director
Anita Bergman, Canadian politician
Bo Bergman (1869–1967), Swedish poet
Borah Bergman (1926–2012), American pianist
Cam Bergman (born 1983), Canadian lacrosse player
Carl Bergman (born 1987), Swedish tennis player
Carl Johan Bergman (born 1978), Swedish biathlete
Charlotte Bergman (1903–2002), Belgian art collector and philanthropist
Christian Bergman (born 1988), American baseball player
Dag Bergman (1914–1984), Swedish diplomat
Daniel Bergman (born 1962), Swedish film director
Dave Bergman (1953–2015), American baseball player
David Bergman (born 1950), American writer
David Bergman (born ca. 1965), British journalist
David Bergman (born 1981), Dutch baseball player
Dusty Bergman (born 1978), American baseball player
Dutch Bergman (1895–1972), American football player and coach
Elin Bergman (born 1995), Swedish singer
Ellen Bergman (1842–1921), Swedish musician and women's rights activist
Eric Bergman (1893–1958), Canadian artist
Erik Bergman (1911–2006), Finnish composer
Eva Bergman (born 1945), Swedish film director
Folke Bergman (1902–1946), Swedish explorer and archaeologist
Gary Bergman (1938–2000), Canadian ice hockey player
Geoff Bergman, American bass guitarist
George Bergman (born 1943), American mathematician
Gustaf Bergman (1898–1971), Swedish boxer
Gustav Bergman (1872–1962), Canadian politician
Håkan Bergman (born 1954), Swedish politician
Henry Bergman (1868–1946), American actor
Hjalmar Bergman (1883–1931), Swedish author
Ingrid Bergman (1915–1982), Swedish actress
Ingmar Bergman (1918–2007), Swedish stage and film director
Jaime Bergman (born 1975), American model and actress
Jack Bergman (born 1947), former United States Marine Corps lieutenant general and U.S Representative from the 1st district of Michigan since 2017
Jay Bergman (disambiguation)
Jeff Bergman (born 1960), American voice actor
Joe Bergman (born 1947), American basketball player and psychiatrist
Jonas Bergman (1724–1810), Finnish painter
Julius Bergman (born 1995), Swedish ice hockey player
Lawrence Bergman (born 1940), Canadian politician
Lena Bergman (born 1943), Swedish actress
Lisbeth Grönfeldt Bergman (born 1948), Swedish politician
Liv Kjersti Bergman (born 1979), Norwegian biathlete
Lowell Bergman (born 1945), American television producer
Marie Bergman (born 1950), Swedish singer
Marilyn Bergman (1929–2022), American composer, songwriter and author
Marit Bergman (born 1975), Swedish musician
Martin Bergman (born 1957), British producer, writer and director
Martina Bergman-Österberg (1849–1915), Swedish physical educationer and feminist
Mary Kay Bergman (1961–1999), American voice actress
Miranda Bergman (born 1940), American muralist
Per Bergman (1886–1950), Swedish sailor
Peter Bergman (1939–2012), American writer and comedian
Peter Bergman (born 1953), American actor
Phil Bergman (born 1971), New Zealand rugby league player
Ram Bergman, Israeli film producer
Robert G. Bergman (born 1942), American chemist
Robert L. Bergman (1948–2013), American politician
Ronen Bergman (born 1972), Israeli journalist and author
S. Bear Bergman (born 1974), American author
Sandahl Bergman (born 1951), American actress
Sergio Bergman,  Argentine rabbi and politician
Shane Bergman (born 1990), Canadian football player
Signe Bergman (1869–1960), Swedish suffragette
Stanisław Bergman (1882–1930), Polish painter
Stefan Bergman (1895–1977), American mathematician
Sten Bergman (1895–1975), Swedish zoologist
Stina Bergman (1888–1976), Swedish author
Sune Bergman (born 1952), Swedish ice hockey player
Susan Bergman (1957–2006), American writer
Thommie Bergman (born 1947), Swedish ice hockey player
Torbern Bergman (1735–1784), Swedish chemist and mineralogist
Ulrika Bergman (born 1975), Swedish curler
Václav Bergman (1915–2002), Czechoslovak war pilot
Vera Bergman (1920–1971), German actress
Walter Bergman (1913–1986), South African numismatist
Yaacov Bergman (born 1945), Israeli conductor

Geographical distribution
As of 2014, 45.9% of all known bearers of the surname Bergman were residents of the United States (frequency 1:13,886), 25.6% of Sweden (1:680), 6.2% of the Netherlands (1:4,780), 3.7% of Canada (1:17,333), 3.4% of South Africa (1:28,141), 3.2% of Finland (1:3,042), 1.9% of Brazil (1:194,774), 1.6% of Australia (1:25,897) and 1.4% of Russia (1:183,111).

In Sweden, the frequency of the surname was higher than national average (1:680) in the following counties:
 1. Västernorrland County (1:288)
 2. Norrbotten County (1:292)
 3. Dalarna County (1:400)
 4. Jämtland County (1:447)
 5. Gävleborg County (1:535)
 6. Västmanland County (1:602)
 7. Uppsala County (1:605)
 8. Örebro County (1:620)
 9. Stockholm County (1:648)
 
In Finland, the frequency of the surname was higher than national average (1:3,042) in the following regions:
 1. Åland (1:236)
 2. Lapland (1:1,343)
 3. Ostrobothnia (1:1,609)
 4. Uusimaa (1:1,770)
 5. Southwest Finland (1:2,074)

See also
 Bergmann
 Bergmann (disambiguation)
 Bergmans

References

German-language surnames
Jewish surnames
Swedish-language surnames
Russian Mennonite surnames